The black hole stability conjecture is the conjecture that a perturbed Kerr black hole will settled back down to a stable state. This has been an open problem in general relativity for some time.

A 2016 paper proved the stability of slowly rotating Kerr black holes in de Sitter space.

A limited stability result for Kerr black holes in Schwarzschild space-time was published by Klainerman et. al. in 2017.

Culminating in 2022, a series of papers was published by Klainerman et. al. which present a proof of the conjecture for slowly rotating Kerr black holes in Minkowski space-time.

References

See also 
 Final state conjecture

Black holes
General relativity
Conjectures that have been proved